ㅟ (wi) is one of the Korean hangul. The Unicode for ㅟ is U+315F.

Hangul jamo
Vowel letters